The Town of Grover is a Statutory Town located in Weld County, Colorado, United States. The town population was 157 at the 2020 United States Census, a 14.60% increase since the 2010 United States Census. Grover is a part of the Greeley, CO Metropolitan Statistical Area and the Front Range Urban Corridor.

Geography
Grover is located at  (40.868393, -104.226126).

Demographics

As of the census of 2000, there were 153 people, 78 households, and 32 families residing in the town. The racial makeup of the town was 96.08% White, 1.96% African American, 1.31% Native American, 0.65% from other races. Hispanic or Latino of any race were 1.96% of the population.

There were 78 households, out of which 23.1% had children under the age of 18 living with them, 39.7% were married couples living together, 2.6% had a female householder with no husband present, and 57.7% were non-families. 52.6% of all households were made up of individuals, and 26.9% had someone living alone who was 65 years of age or older. The average household size was 1.96 and the average family size was 3.15.

In the town, the population was spread out, with 26.1% under the age of 18, 1.3% from 18 to 24, 22.9% from 25 to 44, 29.4% from 45 to 64, and 20.3% who were 65 years of age or older. The median age was 45 years. For every 100 females, there were 86.6 males. For every 100 females age 18 and over, there were 85.2 males.

The median income for a household in the town was $17,679, and the median income for a family was $18,438. Males had a median income of $21,875 versus $25,625 for females. The per capita income for the town was $9,342. About 36.0% of families and 45.2% of the population were below the poverty line, including 71.4% of those under the age of eighteen and 20.0% of those 65 or over.

Allusions in literature

Willa Cather's 1900 short story The Affair at Grover Station contains a description of Grover, as per, 'You know what Grover is, a red box of a station, section house barricaded by coal sheds and a little group of dwellings at the end of everything, with the desert running out on every side to the sky line.'

See also

Colorado
Bibliography of Colorado
Index of Colorado-related articles
Outline of Colorado
List of counties in Colorado
List of municipalities in Colorado
List of places in Colorado
List of statistical areas in Colorado
Front Range Urban Corridor
North Central Colorado Urban Area
Denver-Aurora, CO Combined Statistical Area
Greeley, CO Metropolitan Statistical Area

References

External links

CDOT map of the Town of Grover

Towns in Weld County, Colorado
Towns in Colorado